The Angola dwarf gecko (Lygodactylus angolensis) is a species of gecko native to southern Africa.

References
https://web.archive.org/web/20070929013959/http://www.zooinstitutes.com/Zoology/continents.asp?name=AFRICA

Lygodactylus
Reptiles described in 1896